Doornbos is a Dutch surname. Notable people with the surname include:

Erika Doornbos (born 1956), Dutch curler
Robert Doornbos (born 1981), Dutch racing driver

See also
Simone Kennedy-Doornbos (born 1970), Dutch politician

Dutch-language surnames